The School of Science and Technology, Singapore (simplified Chinese: 新科技中学; traditional Chinese: 新科技中學; pinyin: xīn kē jì zhōng xué) (abbreviation: SST) is a specialised independent secondary school in Singapore, offering a four-year Singapore-Cambridge GCE Ordinary Level (O-Level) Programme.

The school uses the Direct School Admissions (DSA) Exercise to obtain its cohort of about 200 students, including a written test and a selection camp. The school does not take part in the Secondary 1 Posting Exercise, and extra slots are filled in by the Supplementary Intake Exercise (SIE). 

The school is also the sixth school in the FutureSchools@Singapore Programme, relying fully on Information and Communications Technology (ICT) for its specialised curriculum.

History
Announced in Parliament by Minister for Education Tharman Shanmugaratnam on 4 March 2008, SST is Singapore's fourth specialised independent school with an emphasis on applied learning, after the Singapore Sports School, NUS High School of Mathematics and Science, and the School of the Arts.

Mr Chua Chor Huat, principal of Ngee Ann Secondary School, was appointed to be principal of SST starting from June 2008. Prof Su Guaning, the President of Nanyang Technological University (NTU), was appointed Chairman of the Board of Directors for SST.

On 11 March 2008, job applications were sent out to all teachers in Singapore. Together with MOE's Curriculum Planning Division, lecturers from Ngee Ann Polytechnic (NP) and NTU, and the teaching staff recruited, the school's curriculum was developed.

From 2010 to 2012, the school was located at an interim campus of former Clementi North Primary School, at 5 Clementi Ave 6.

On 4 January 2010, the school welcomed its first batch of students, while waiting for completion of the permanent campus.

On 29 March 2010, a Groundbreaking Ceremony was held for the school, with Senior Minister of State, Ministry of National Development, and Ministry of Education Grace Fu. SST also received a S$8.1 million donation from Ngee Ann Kongsi, to be used for annual scholarships and bursaries.

On 3 January 2012, SST moved to its permanent and current location, at 1 Technology Drive.

On 13 April 2013, SST was officially declared open by Deputy Prime Minister and Minister for Finance Tharman Shanmugaratnam.

Principals

Curriculum
The school offers both academic subjects and Applied Subjects (AS) for its four-year O-Level curriculum. Applied Subjects are examinable at O-Levels, administered by Singapore Examinations and Assessment Board (SEAB) or NP.

Initially, the school offered Biotechnology, Design Studies, Media Studies, Environmental Science and Technology, and Fundamental of Electronics. Currently, the school offers Biotechnology, Design Studies, Electronics, and Computing.

Extended Curriculum 
The extended curriculum named ChangeMakers (CM) Program, combines principles and skills from, Information and Communications Technology (ICT), Innovation & Entrepreneurship (I&E), Art, Design, Media & Technology (ADMT). This program is taught by solving real world issues within and across the disciplines.

Integrated Diploma Programme (IDP) 
Announced by the Minister for Education Lawrence Wong on 17 November 2020, during SST's 10th year anniversary celebration, in collaboration with NP, the IDP allows students to study a STEM-related course in NP, bypassing O-Levels.

Campus
The SST Campus consists of 4 blocks and a football field, situated north-east of the junction of Clementi Road and Commonwealth Avenue West, a short walk away from Singapore Polytechnic.

Science Hub 
The Science Hub consists of ten laboratories, four dedicated to the Applied Sciences, as well as a tissue culture room, a research lab, and an engineering lab.

Sports Complex 
The Ngee Ann Kongsi Sports Complex was constructed with donations received from Ngee Ann Kongsi. It has both indoor and outdoor sports facilities, in addition to a synthetic football field.

References

External links
 SST Website

Independent schools in Singapore
Secondary schools in Singapore
Clementi